Apollo 11 (July 16–24, 1969) was the American spaceflight that first landed humans on the Moon. Commander Neil Armstrong and lunar module pilot Buzz Aldrin landed the Apollo Lunar Module Eagle on July 20, 1969, at 20:17 UTC, and Armstrong became the first person to step onto the Moon's surface six hours and 39 minutes later, on July 21 at 02:56 UTC. Aldrin joined him 19 minutes later, and they spent about two and a quarter hours together exploring the site they had named Tranquility Base upon landing. Armstrong and Aldrin collected  of lunar material to bring back to Earth as pilot Michael Collins flew the Command Module Columbia in lunar orbit, and were on the Moon's surface for 21 hours, 36 minutes before lifting off to rejoin Columbia.

Apollo 11 was launched by a Saturn V rocket from Kennedy Space Center on Merritt Island, Florida, on July 16 at 13:32 UTC, and it was the fifth crewed mission of NASA's Apollo program. The Apollo spacecraft had three parts: a command module (CM) with a cabin for the three astronauts, the only part that returned to Earth; a service module (SM), which supported the command module with propulsion, electrical power, oxygen, and water; and a lunar module (LM) that had two stages—a descent stage for landing on the Moon and an ascent stage to place the astronauts back into lunar orbit.

After being sent to the Moon by the Saturn V's third stage, the astronauts separated the spacecraft from it and traveled for three days until they entered lunar orbit. Armstrong and Aldrin then moved into Eagle and landed in the Sea of Tranquility on July 20. The astronauts used Eagles ascent stage to lift off from the lunar surface and rejoin Collins in the command module. They jettisoned Eagle before they performed the maneuvers that propelled Columbia out of the last of its 30 lunar orbits onto a trajectory back to Earth. They returned to Earth and splashed down in the Pacific Ocean on July 24 after more than eight days in space.

Armstrong's first step onto the lunar surface was broadcast on live TV to a worldwide audience. He described the event as "one small step for [a] man, one giant leap for mankind." Apollo 11 effectively proved US victory in the Space Race to demonstrate spaceflight superiority, by fulfilling a national goal proposed in 1961 by President John F. Kennedy, "before this decade is out, of landing a man on the Moon and returning him safely to the Earth."

Background 

In the late 1950s and early 1960s, the United States was engaged in the Cold War, a geopolitical rivalry with the Soviet Union. On October 4, 1957, the Soviet Union launched Sputnik 1, the first artificial satellite. This surprise success fired fears and imaginations around the world. It demonstrated that the Soviet Union had the capability to deliver nuclear weapons over intercontinental distances, and challenged American claims of military, economic and technological superiority. This precipitated the Sputnik crisis, and triggered the Space Race to prove which superpower would achieve superior spaceflight capability. President Dwight D. Eisenhower responded to the Sputnik challenge by creating the National Aeronautics and Space Administration (NASA), and initiating Project Mercury, which aimed to launch a man into Earth orbit. But on April 12, 1961, Soviet cosmonaut Yuri Gagarin became the first person in space, and the first to orbit the Earth. Nearly a month later, on May 5, 1961, Alan Shepard became the first American in space, completing a 15-minute suborbital journey. After being recovered from the Atlantic Ocean, he received a congratulatory telephone call from Eisenhower's successor, John F. Kennedy.

Since the Soviet Union had higher lift capacity launch vehicles, Kennedy chose, from among options presented by NASA, a challenge beyond the capacity of the existing generation of rocketry, so that the US and Soviet Union would be starting from a position of equality. A crewed mission to the Moon would serve this purpose.

On May 25, 1961, Kennedy addressed the United States Congress on "Urgent National Needs" and declared:

On September 12, 1962, Kennedy delivered another speech before a crowd of about 40,000 people in the Rice University football stadium in Houston, Texas. A widely quoted refrain from the middle portion of the speech reads as follows:

In spite of that, the proposed program faced the opposition of many Americans and was dubbed a "moondoggle" by Norbert Wiener, a mathematician at the Massachusetts Institute of Technology. The effort to land a man on the Moon already had a name: Project Apollo. When Kennedy met with Nikita Khrushchev, the Premier of the Soviet Union in June 1961, he proposed making the Moon landing a joint project, but Khrushchev did not take up the offer. Kennedy again proposed a joint expedition to the Moon in a speech to the United Nations General Assembly on September 20, 1963. The idea of a joint Moon mission was abandoned after Kennedy's death.

An early and crucial decision was choosing lunar orbit rendezvous over both direct ascent and Earth orbit rendezvous. A space rendezvous is an orbital maneuver in which two spacecraft navigate through space and meet up. In July 1962 NASA head James Webb announced that lunar orbit rendezvous would be used and that the Apollo spacecraft would have three major parts: a command module (CM) with a cabin for the three astronauts, and the only part that returned to Earth; a service module (SM), which supported the command module with propulsion, electrical power, oxygen, and water; and a lunar module (LM) that had two stages—a descent stage for landing on the Moon, and an ascent stage to place the astronauts back into lunar orbit. This design meant the spacecraft could be launched by a single Saturn V rocket that was then under development.

Technologies and techniques required for Apollo were developed by Project Gemini. The Apollo project was enabled by NASA's adoption of new advances in semiconductor electronic technology, including metal–oxide–semiconductor field-effect transistors (MOSFETs) in the Interplanetary Monitoring Platform (IMP) and silicon integrated circuit (IC) chips in the Apollo Guidance Computer (AGC).

Project Apollo was abruptly halted by the Apollo 1 fire on January 27, 1967, in which astronauts Gus Grissom, Ed White, and Roger B. Chaffee died, and the subsequent investigation. In October 1968, Apollo 7 evaluated the command module in Earth orbit, and in December Apollo 8 tested it in lunar orbit. In March 1969, Apollo 9 put the lunar module through its paces in Earth orbit, and in May Apollo 10 conducted a "dress rehearsal" in lunar orbit. By July 1969, all was in readiness for Apollo 11 to take the final step onto the Moon.

The Soviet Union appeared  to be winning the Space Race by beating the US to firsts, but its early lead was overtaken by the US Gemini program and Soviet failure to develop the N1 launcher, which would have been comparable to the Saturn V. The Soviets tried to beat the US to return lunar material to the Earth by means of uncrewed probes. On July 13, three days before Apollo 11's launch, the Soviet Union launched Luna 15, which reached lunar orbit before Apollo 11. During descent, a malfunction caused Luna 15 to crash in Mare Crisium about two hours before Armstrong and Aldrin took off from the Moon's surface to begin their voyage home. The Nuffield Radio Astronomy Laboratories radio telescope in England recorded transmissions from Luna 15 during its descent, and these were released in July 2009 for the 40th anniversary of Apollo 11.

Personnel

Prime crew 

The initial crew assignment of Commander Neil Armstrong, Command Module Pilot (CMP) Jim Lovell, and Lunar Module Pilot (LMP) Buzz Aldrin on the backup crew for Apollo 9 was officially announced on November 20, 1967. Lovell and Aldrin had previously flown together as the crew of Gemini 12. Due to design and manufacturing delays in the LM, Apollo 8 and Apollo 9 swapped prime and backup crews, and Armstrong's crew became the backup for Apollo 8. Based on the normal crew rotation scheme, Armstrong was then expected to command Apollo 11.

There would be one change. Michael Collins, the CMP on the Apollo 8 crew, began experiencing trouble with his legs. Doctors diagnosed the problem as a bony growth between his fifth and sixth vertebrae, requiring surgery. Lovell took his place on the Apollo 8 crew, and when Collins recovered he joined Armstrong's crew as CMP. In the meantime, Fred Haise filled in as backup LMP, and Aldrin as backup CMP for Apollo 8. Apollo 11 was the second American mission where all the crew members had prior spaceflight experience, the first being Apollo 10. The next was STS-26 in 1988.

Deke Slayton gave Armstrong the option to replace Aldrin with Lovell, since some thought Aldrin was difficult to work with. Armstrong had no issues working with Aldrin but thought it over for a day before declining. He thought Lovell deserved to command his own mission (eventually Apollo 13).

The Apollo 11 prime crew had none of the close cheerful camaraderie characterized by that of Apollo 12. Instead, they forged an amiable working relationship. Armstrong in particular was notoriously aloof, but Collins, who considered himself a loner, confessed to rebuffing Aldrin's attempts to create a more personal relationship. Aldrin and Collins described the crew as "amiable strangers". Armstrong did not agree with the assessment, and said "... all the crews I was on worked very well together."

Backup crew 

The backup crew consisted of Lovell as Commander, William Anders as CMP, and Haise as LMP. Anders had flown with Lovell on Apollo 8. In early 1969, Anders accepted a job with the National Aeronautics and Space Council effective August 1969, and announced he would retire as an astronaut at that time. Ken Mattingly was moved from the support crew into parallel training with Anders as backup CMP in case Apollo 11 was delayed past its intended July launch date, at which point Anders would be unavailable.

By the normal crew rotation in place during Apollo, Lovell, Mattingly, and Haise were scheduled to fly on Apollo 14, but the three of them were bumped to Apollo 13: there was a crew issue for Apollo 13 as none of them except Edgar Mitchell flew in space again. George Mueller rejected the crew and this was the first time an Apollo crew was rejected. To give Shepard more training time, Lovell's crew were bumped to Apollo 13. Mattingly would later be replaced by Jack Swigert as CMP on Apollo 13.

Support crew 

During Projects Mercury and Gemini, each mission had a prime and a backup crew. For Apollo, a third crew of astronauts was added, known as the support crew. The support crew maintained the flight plan, checklists and mission ground rules, and ensured the prime and backup crews were apprised of changes. They developed procedures, especially those for emergency situations, so these were ready for when the prime and backup crews came to train in the simulators, allowing them to concentrate on practicing and mastering them. For Apollo 11, the support crew consisted of Ken Mattingly, Ronald Evans and Bill Pogue.

Capsule communicators 

The capsule communicator (CAPCOM) was an astronaut at the Mission Control Center in Houston, Texas, who was the only person who communicated directly with the flight crew. For Apollo 11, the CAPCOMs were: Charles Duke, Ronald Evans, Bruce McCandless II, James Lovell, William Anders, Ken Mattingly, Fred Haise, Don L. Lind, Owen K. Garriott and Harrison Schmitt.

Flight directors 

The flight directors for this mission were:

Other key personnel 

Other key personnel who played important roles in the Apollo 11 mission include the following.

Preparations

Insignia 

The Apollo 11 mission emblem was designed by Collins, who wanted a symbol for "peaceful lunar landing by the United States". At Lovell's suggestion, he chose the bald eagle, the national bird of the United States, as the symbol. Tom Wilson, a simulator instructor, suggested an olive branch in its beak to represent their peaceful mission. Collins added a lunar background with the Earth in the distance. The sunlight in the image was coming from the wrong direction; the shadow should have been in the lower part of the Earth instead of the left. Aldrin, Armstrong and Collins decided the Eagle and the Moon would be in their natural colors, and decided on a blue and gold border. Armstrong was concerned that "eleven" would not be understood by non-English speakers, so they went with "Apollo 11", and they decided not to put their names on the patch, so it would "be representative of everyone who had worked toward a lunar landing".

An illustrator at the Manned Spacecraft Center (MSC) did the artwork, which was then sent off to NASA officials for approval. The design was rejected. Bob Gilruth, the director of the MSC felt the talons of the eagle looked "too warlike". After some discussion, the olive branch was moved to the talons. When the Eisenhower dollar coin was released in 1971, the patch design provided the eagle for its reverse side. The design was also used for the smaller Susan B. Anthony dollar unveiled in 1979.

Call signs 

After the crew of Apollo 10 named their spacecraft Charlie Brown and Snoopy, assistant manager for public affairs Julian Scheer wrote to George Low, the Manager of the Apollo Spacecraft Program Office at the MSC, to suggest the Apollo 11 crew be less flippant in naming their craft. The name Snowcone was used for the CM and Haystack was used for the LM in both internal and external communications during early mission planning.

The LM was named Eagle after the motif which was featured prominently on the mission insignia. At Scheer's suggestion, the CM was named Columbia after Columbiad, the giant cannon that launched a spacecraft (also from Florida) in Jules Verne's 1865 novel From the Earth to the Moon. It also referred to Columbia, a historical name of the United States.  In Collins' 1976 book, he said Columbia was in reference to Christopher Columbus.

Mementos 

The astronauts had personal preference kits (PPKs), small bags containing personal items of significance they wanted to take with them on the mission. Five  PPKs were carried on Apollo 11: three (one for each astronaut) were stowed on Columbia before launch, and two on Eagle.

Neil Armstrong's LM PPK contained a piece of wood from the Wright brothers' 1903 Wright Flyers left propeller and a piece of fabric from its wing, along with a diamond-studded astronaut pin originally given to Slayton by the widows of the Apollo 1 crew. This pin had been intended to be flown on that mission and given to Slayton afterwards, but following the disastrous launch pad fire and subsequent funerals, the widows gave the pin to Slayton. Armstrong took it with him on Apollo 11.

Site selection 

NASA's Apollo Site Selection Board announced five potential landing sites on February 8, 1968. These were the result of two years' worth of studies based on high-resolution photography of the lunar surface by the five uncrewed probes of the Lunar Orbiter program and information about surface conditions provided by the Surveyor program. The best Earth-bound telescopes could not resolve features with the resolution Project Apollo required. The landing site had to be close to the lunar equator to minimize the amount of propellant required, clear of obstacles to minimize maneuvering, and flat to simplify the task of the landing radar. Scientific value was not a consideration.

Areas that appeared promising on photographs taken on Earth were often found to be totally unacceptable. The original requirement that the site be free of craters had to be relaxed, as no such site was found. Five sites were considered: Sites 1 and 2 were in the Sea of Tranquility (Mare Tranquillitatis); Site 3 was in the Central Bay (Sinus Medii); and Sites 4 and 5 were in the Ocean of Storms (Oceanus Procellarum).
The final site selection was based on seven criteria:
 The site needed to be smooth, with relatively few craters;
 with approach paths free of large hills, tall cliffs or deep craters that might confuse the landing radar and cause it to issue incorrect readings;
 reachable with a minimum amount of propellant;
 allowing for delays in the launch countdown;
 providing the Apollo spacecraft with a free-return trajectory, one that would allow it to coast around the Moon and safely return to Earth without requiring any engine firings should a problem arise on the way to the Moon;
 with good visibility during the landing approach, meaning the Sun would be between 7 and 20 degrees behind the LM; and
 a general slope of less than two degrees in the landing area.

The requirement for the Sun angle was particularly restrictive, limiting the launch date to one day per month. A landing just after dawn was chosen to limit the temperature extremes the astronauts would experience. The Apollo Site Selection Board selected Site 2, with Sites 3 and 5 as backups in the event of the launch being delayed. In May 1969, Apollo 10's lunar module flew to within  of Site 2, and reported it was acceptable.

First-step decision 
During the first press conference after the Apollo 11 crew was announced, the first question was, "Which one of you gentlemen will be the first man to step onto the lunar surface?" Slayton told the reporter it had not been decided, and Armstrong added that it was "not based on individual desire".

One of the first versions of the egress checklist had the lunar module pilot exit the spacecraft before the commander, which matched what had been done on Gemini missions, where the commander had never performed the spacewalk. Reporters wrote in early 1969 that Aldrin would be the first man to walk on the Moon, and Associate Administrator George Mueller told reporters he would be first as well. Aldrin heard that Armstrong would be the first because Armstrong was a civilian, which made Aldrin livid. Aldrin attempted to persuade other lunar module pilots he should be first, but they responded cynically about what they perceived as a lobbying campaign. Attempting to stem interdepartmental conflict, Slayton told Aldrin that Armstrong would be first since he was the commander. The decision was announced in a press conference on April 14, 1969.

For decades, Aldrin believed the final decision was largely driven by the lunar module's hatch location. Because the astronauts had their spacesuits on and the spacecraft was so small, maneuvering to exit the spacecraft was difficult. The crew tried a simulation in which Aldrin left the spacecraft first, but he damaged the simulator while attempting to egress. While this was enough for mission planners to make their decision, Aldrin and Armstrong were left in the dark on the decision until late spring. Slayton told Armstrong the plan was to have him leave the spacecraft first, if he agreed. Armstrong said, "Yes, that's the way to do it."

The media accused Armstrong of exercising his commander's prerogative to exit the spacecraft first. Chris Kraft revealed in his 2001 autobiography that a meeting occurred between Gilruth, Slayton, Low, and himself to make sure Aldrin would not be the first to walk on the Moon. They argued that the first person to walk on the Moon should be like Charles Lindbergh, a calm and quiet person. They made the decision to change the flight plan so the commander was the first to egress from the spacecraft.

Pre-launch 

The ascent stage of LM-5 Eagle arrived at the Kennedy Space Center on January 8, 1969, followed by the descent stage four days later, and CSM-107 Columbia on January 23. There were several differences between Eagle and Apollo 10's LM-4 Snoopy; Eagle had a VHF radio antenna to facilitate communication with the astronauts during their EVA on the lunar surface; a lighter ascent engine; more thermal protection on the landing gear; and a package of scientific experiments known as the Early Apollo Scientific Experiments Package (EASEP). The only change in the configuration of the command module was the removal of some insulation from the forward hatch. The CSM was mated on January 29, and moved from the Operations and Checkout Building to the Vehicle Assembly Building on April 14.

The S-IVB third stage of Saturn V AS-506 had arrived on January 18, followed by the S-II second stage on February 6, S-IC first stage on February 20, and the Saturn V Instrument Unit on February 27. At 12:30 on May 20, the  assembly departed the Vehicle Assembly Building atop the crawler-transporter, bound for Launch Pad 39A, part of Launch Complex 39, while Apollo 10 was still on its way to the Moon. A countdown test commenced on June 26, and concluded on July 2. The launch complex was floodlit on the night of July 15, when the crawler-transporter carried the mobile service structure back to its parking area. In the early hours of the morning, the fuel tanks of the S-II and S-IVB stages were filled with liquid hydrogen. Fueling was completed by three hours before launch. Launch operations were partly automated, with 43 programs written in the ATOLL programming language.

Slayton roused the crew shortly after 04:00, and they showered, shaved, and had the traditional pre-flight breakfast of steak and eggs with Slayton and the backup crew. They then donned their space suits and began breathing pure oxygen. At 06:30, they headed out to Launch Complex 39. Haise entered Columbia about three hours and ten minutes before launch time. Along with a technician, he helped Armstrong into the left-hand couch at 06:54. Five minutes later, Collins joined him, taking up his position on the right-hand couch. Finally, Aldrin entered, taking the center couch. Haise left around two hours and ten minutes before launch. The closeout crew sealed the hatch, and the cabin was purged and pressurized. The closeout crew then left the launch complex about an hour before launch time. The countdown became automated at three minutes and twenty seconds before launch time. Over 450 personnel were at the consoles in the firing room.

Mission

Launch and flight to lunar orbit 

An estimated one million spectators watched the launch of Apollo 11 from the highways and beaches in the vicinity of the launch site. Dignitaries included the Chief of Staff of the United States Army, General William Westmoreland, four cabinet members, 19 state governors, 40 mayors, 60 ambassadors and 200 congressmen. Vice President Spiro Agnew viewed the launch with former president Lyndon B. Johnson and his wife Lady Bird Johnson. Around 3,500 media representatives were present. About two-thirds were from the United States; the rest came from 55 other countries. The launch was televised live in 33 countries, with an estimated 25 million viewers in the United States alone. Millions more around the world listened to radio broadcasts. President Richard Nixon viewed the launch from his office in the White House with his NASA liaison officer, Apollo astronaut Frank Borman.

Saturn V AS-506 launched Apollo 11 on July 16, 1969, at 13:32:00 UTC (9:32:00 EDT). At 13.2 seconds into the flight, the launch vehicle began to roll into its flight azimuth of 72.058°. Full shutdown of the first-stage engines occurred about 2 minutes and 42 seconds into the mission, followed by separation of the S-IC and ignition of the S-II engines. The second stage engines then cut off and separated at about 9 minutes and 8 seconds, allowing the first ignition of the S-IVB engine a few seconds later.

After one and a half orbits, a second ignition of the S-IVB engine pushed the spacecraft onto its trajectory toward the Moon with the trans-lunar injection (TLI) burn at 16:22:13 UTC. About 30 minutes later, with Collins in the left seat and at the controls, the transposition, docking, and extraction maneuver was performed. This involved separating Columbia from the spent S-IVB stage, turning around, and docking with Eagle still attached to the stage. After the LM was extracted, the combined spacecraft headed for the Moon, while the rocket stage flew on a trajectory past the Moon. This was done to avoid the third stage colliding with the spacecraft, the Earth, or the Moon. A slingshot effect from passing around the Moon threw it into an orbit around the Sun.

On July 19 at 17:21:50 UTC, Apollo 11 passed behind the Moon and fired its service propulsion engine to enter lunar orbit.

Lunar descent 

At 12:52:00 UTC on July 20, Aldrin and Armstrong entered Eagle, and began the final preparations for lunar descent. At 17:44:00 Eagle separated from Columbia. Collins, alone aboard Columbia, inspected Eagle as it pirouetted before him to ensure the craft was not damaged, and that the landing gear was correctly deployed. Armstrong exclaimed: "The Eagle has wings!"

As the descent began, Armstrong and Aldrin found themselves passing landmarks on the surface two or three seconds early, and reported that they were "long"; they would land miles west of their target point. Eagle was traveling too fast. The problem could have been mascons—concentrations of high mass in a region or regions of the Moon's crust that contains a gravitational anomaly, potentially altering Eagle trajectory. Flight Director Gene Kranz speculated that it could have resulted from extra air pressure in the docking tunnel, or a result of Eagles pirouette maneuver.

Inside Mission Control Center, computer engineer Jack Garman told Guidance Officer Steve Bales it was safe to continue the descent, and this was relayed to the crew. The program alarms indicated "executive overflows", meaning the guidance computer could not complete all its tasks in real-time and had to postpone some of them. Margaret Hamilton, the Director of Apollo Flight Computer Programming at the MIT Charles Stark Draper Laboratory later recalled:

During the mission, the cause was diagnosed as the rendezvous radar switch being in the wrong position, causing the computer to process data from both the rendezvous and landing radars at the same time. Software engineer Don Eyles concluded in a 2005 Guidance and Control Conference paper that the problem was due to a hardware design bug previously seen during testing of the first uncrewed LM in Apollo 5. Having the rendezvous radar on (so it was warmed up in case of an emergency landing abort) should have been irrelevant to the computer, but an electrical phasing mismatch between two parts of the rendezvous radar system could cause the stationary antenna to appear to the computer as dithering back and forth between two positions, depending upon how the hardware randomly powered up. The extra spurious cycle stealing, as the rendezvous radar updated an involuntary counter, caused the computer alarms.

Landing 

When Armstrong again looked outside, he saw that the computer's landing target was in a boulder-strewn area just north and east of a  crater (later determined to be West crater), so he took semi-automatic control. Armstrong considered landing short of the boulder field so they could collect geological samples from it, but could not since their horizontal velocity was too high. Throughout the descent, Aldrin called out navigation data to Armstrong, who was busy piloting Eagle.

Armstrong found a clear patch of ground and maneuvered the spacecraft towards it. He cleared the crater and found another patch of level ground. They were now  from the surface, with only 90 seconds of propellant remaining. Lunar dust kicked up by the LM's engine began to impair his ability to determine the spacecraft's motion. Some large rocks jutted out of the dust cloud, and Armstrong focused on them during his descent so he could determine the spacecraft's speed.

A light informed Aldrin that at least one of the  probes hanging from Eagle footpads had touched the surface a few moments before the landing and he said: "Contact light!" Armstrong was supposed to immediately shut the engine down, as the engineers suspected the pressure caused by the engine's own exhaust reflecting off the lunar surface could make it explode, but he forgot. Three seconds later, Eagle landed and Armstrong shut the engine down. Aldrin immediately said "Okay, engine stop. ACA—out of detent." Armstrong acknowledged: "Out of detent. Auto." Aldrin continued: "Mode control—both auto. Descent engine command override off. Engine arm—off. 413 is in."

ACA was the Attitude Control Assembly—the LM's control stick. Output went to the LGC to command the reaction control system (RCS) jets to fire. "Out of Detent" meant the stick had moved away from its centered position; it was spring-centered like the turn indicator in a car. LGC address 413 contained the variable that indicated the LM had landed.

Information available to the crew and mission controllers during the landing showed the LM had enough fuel for another 25 seconds of powered flight before an abort without touchdown would have become unsafe, but post-mission analysis showed that the real figure was probably closer to 50 seconds. Apollo 11 landed with less fuel than most subsequent missions, and the astronauts encountered a premature low fuel warning. This was later found to be the result of the propellant sloshing more than expected, uncovering a fuel sensor. On subsequent missions, extra anti-slosh baffles were added to the tanks to prevent this.

Armstrong acknowledged Aldrin's completion of the post-landing checklist with "Engine arm is off", before responding to the CAPCOM, Charles Duke, with the words, "Houston, Tranquility Base here. The Eagle has landed." Armstrong's unrehearsed change of call sign from "Eagle" to "Tranquility Base" emphasized to listeners that landing was complete and successful. Duke mispronounced his reply as he expressed the relief at Mission Control: "Roger, Twan—Tranquility, we copy you on the ground. You got a bunch of guys about to turn blue. We're breathing again. Thanks a lot."

Two and a half hours after landing, before preparations began for the EVA, Aldrin radioed to Earth:

He then took communion privately. At this time NASA was still fighting a lawsuit brought by atheist Madalyn Murray O'Hair (who had objected to the Apollo 8 crew reading from the Book of Genesis) demanding that their astronauts refrain from broadcasting religious activities while in space. For this reason, Aldrin chose to refrain from directly mentioning taking communion on the Moon. Aldrin was an elder at the Webster Presbyterian Church, and his communion kit was prepared by the pastor of the church, Dean Woodruff. Webster Presbyterian possesses the chalice used on the Moon and commemorates the event each year on the Sunday closest to July 20. The schedule for the mission called for the astronauts to follow the landing with a five-hour sleep period, but they chose to begin preparations for the EVA early, thinking they would be unable to sleep.

Lunar surface operations 

Preparations for Neil Armstrong and Buzz Aldrin to walk on the Moon began at 23:43 UTC. These took longer than expected; three and a half hours instead of two. During training on Earth, everything required had been neatly laid out in advance, but on the Moon the cabin contained a large number of other items as well, such as checklists, food packets, and tools. Six hours and thirty-nine minutes after landing Armstrong and Aldrin were ready to go outside, and Eagle was depressurized.

Eagles hatch was opened at 02:39:33. Armstrong initially had some difficulties squeezing through the hatch with his portable life support system (PLSS). Some of the highest heart rates recorded from Apollo astronauts occurred during LM egress and ingress. At 02:51 Armstrong began his descent to the lunar surface. The remote control unit on his chest kept him from seeing his feet. Climbing down the nine-rung ladder, Armstrong pulled a D-ring to deploy the modular equipment stowage assembly (MESA) folded against Eagle side and activate the TV camera.

Apollo 11 used slow-scan television (TV) incompatible with broadcast TV, so it was displayed on a special monitor and a conventional TV camera viewed this monitor (thus, a broadcast of a broadcast), significantly reducing the quality of the picture. The signal was received at Goldstone in the United States, but with better fidelity by Honeysuckle Creek Tracking Station near Canberra in Australia. Minutes later the feed was switched to the more sensitive Parkes radio telescope in Australia. Despite some technical and weather difficulties, ghostly black and white images of the first lunar EVA were received and broadcast to at least 600 million people on Earth. Copies of this video in broadcast format were saved and are widely available, but recordings of the original slow scan source transmission from the lunar surface were likely destroyed during routine magnetic tape re-use at NASA.

After describing the surface dust as "very fine-grained" and "almost like a powder", at 02:56:15, six and a half hours after landing, Armstrong stepped off Eagle footpad and declared: "That's one small step for [a] man, one giant leap for mankind."

Armstrong intended to say "That's one small step for a man", but the word "a" is not audible in the transmission, and thus was not initially reported by most observers of the live broadcast. When later asked about his quote, Armstrong said he believed he said "for a man", and subsequent printed versions of the quote included the "a" in square brackets. One explanation for the absence may be that his accent caused him to slur the words "for a" together; another is the intermittent nature of the audio and video links to Earth, partly because of storms near Parkes Observatory. A more recent digital analysis of the tape claims to reveal the "a" may have been spoken but obscured by static. Other analysis points to the claims of static and slurring as "face-saving fabrication", and that Armstrong himself later admitted to misspeaking the line.

About seven minutes after stepping onto the Moon's surface, Armstrong collected a contingency soil sample using a sample bag on a stick. He then folded the bag and tucked it into a pocket on his right thigh. This was to guarantee there would be some lunar soil brought back in case an emergency required the astronauts to abandon the EVA and return to the LM. Twelve minutes after the sample was collected, he removed the TV camera from the MESA and made a panoramic sweep, then mounted it on a tripod. The TV camera cable remained partly coiled and presented a tripping hazard throughout the EVA. Still photography was accomplished with a Hasselblad camera that could be operated hand held or mounted on Armstrong's Apollo space suit. Aldrin joined Armstrong on the surface. He described the view with the simple phrase: "Magnificent desolation."

Armstrong said moving in the lunar gravity, one-sixth of Earth's, was "even perhaps easier than the simulations ... It's absolutely no trouble to walk around." Aldrin joined him on the surface and tested methods for moving around, including two-footed kangaroo hops. The PLSS backpack created a tendency to tip backward, but neither astronaut had serious problems maintaining balance. Loping became the preferred method of movement. The astronauts reported that they needed to plan their movements six or seven steps ahead. The fine soil was quite slippery. Aldrin remarked that moving from sunlight into Eagle shadow produced no temperature change inside the suit, but the helmet was warmer in sunlight, so he felt cooler in shadow. The MESA failed to provide a stable work platform and was in shadow, slowing work somewhat. As they worked, the moonwalkers kicked up gray dust, which soiled the outer part of their suits.

The astronauts planted the Lunar Flag Assembly containing a flag of the United States on the lunar surface, in clear view of the TV camera. Aldrin remembered, "Of all the jobs I had to do on the Moon the one I wanted to go the smoothest was the flag raising." But the astronauts struggled with the telescoping rod and could only jam the pole about  into the hard lunar surface. Aldrin was afraid it might topple in front of TV viewers, but gave "a crisp West Point salute". Before Aldrin could take a photo of Armstrong with the flag, President Richard Nixon spoke to them through a telephone-radio transmission, which Nixon called "the most historic phone call ever made from the White House." Nixon originally had a long speech prepared to read during the phone call, but Frank Borman, who was at the White House as a NASA liaison during Apollo 11, convinced Nixon to keep his words brief.

They deployed the EASEP, which included a passive seismic experiment package used to measure moonquakes and a retroreflector array used for the lunar laser ranging experiment. Then Armstrong walked  from the LM to snap photos at the rim of Little West Crater while Aldrin collected two core samples. The astronauts then collected rock samples using scoops and tongs on extension handles. Many of the surface activities took longer than expected, so they had to stop documenting sample collection halfway through the allotted 34 minutes. Aldrin shoveled  of soil into the box of rocks in order to pack them in tightly. Two types of rocks were found in the geological samples: basalt and breccia. Three new minerals were discovered in the rock samples collected by the astronauts: armalcolite, tranquillityite, and pyroxferroite. Armalcolite was named after Armstrong, Aldrin, and Collins. All have subsequently been found on Earth.

While on the surface, Armstrong uncovered a plaque mounted on the LM ladder, bearing two drawings of Earth (of the Western and Eastern Hemispheres), an inscription, and signatures of the astronauts and President Nixon. The inscription read:

At the behest of the Nixon administration to add a reference to God, NASA included the vague date as a reason to include A.D., which stands for Anno Domini, "in the year of our Lord" (although it should have been placed before the year, not after).

Mission Control used a coded phrase to warn Armstrong his metabolic rates were high, and that he should slow down. He was moving rapidly from task to task as time ran out. As metabolic rates remained generally lower than expected for both astronauts throughout the walk, Mission Control granted the astronauts a 15-minute extension. In a 2010 interview, Armstrong explained that NASA limited the first moonwalk's time and distance because there was no empirical proof of how much cooling water the astronauts' PLSS backpacks would consume to handle their body heat generation while working on the Moon.

Lunar ascent 

Aldrin entered Eagle first. With some difficulty the astronauts lifted film and two sample boxes containing  of lunar surface material to the LM hatch using a flat cable pulley device called the Lunar Equipment Conveyor (LEC). This proved to be an inefficient tool, and later missions preferred to carry equipment and samples up to the LM by hand. Armstrong reminded Aldrin of a bag of memorial items in his sleeve pocket, and Aldrin tossed the bag down. Armstrong then jumped onto the ladder's third rung, and climbed into the LM. After transferring to LM life support, the explorers lightened the ascent stage for the return to lunar orbit by tossing out their PLSS backpacks, lunar overshoes, an empty Hasselblad camera, and other equipment. The hatch was closed again at 05:11:13. They then pressurized the LM and settled down to sleep.

Presidential speech writer William Safire had prepared an In Event of Moon Disaster announcement for Nixon to read in the event the Apollo 11 astronauts were stranded on the Moon. The remarks were in a memo from Safire to Nixon's White House Chief of Staff H. R. Haldeman, in which Safire suggested a protocol the administration might follow in reaction to such a disaster. According to the plan, Mission Control would "close down communications" with the LM, and a clergyman would "commend their souls to the deepest of the deep" in a public ritual likened to burial at sea. The last line of the prepared text contained an allusion to Rupert Brooke's World War I poem "The Soldier".

While moving inside the cabin, Aldrin accidentally damaged the circuit breaker that would arm the main engine for liftoff from the Moon. There was a concern this would prevent firing the engine, stranding them on the Moon. The nonconductive tip of a Duro felt-tip pen was sufficient to activate the switch.

After more than  hours on the lunar surface, in addition to the scientific instruments, the astronauts left behind: an Apollo 1 mission patch in memory of astronauts Roger Chaffee, Gus Grissom, and Edward White, who died when their command module caught fire during a test in January 1967; two memorial medals of Soviet cosmonauts Vladimir Komarov and Yuri Gagarin, who died in 1967 and 1968 respectively; a memorial bag containing a gold replica of an olive branch as a traditional symbol of peace; and a silicon message disk carrying the goodwill statements by Presidents Eisenhower, Kennedy, Johnson, and Nixon along with messages from leaders of 73 countries around the world. The disk also carries a listing of the leadership of the US Congress, a listing of members of the four committees of the House and Senate responsible for the NASA legislation, and the names of NASA's past and then-current top management.

After about seven hours of rest, the crew was awakened by Houston to prepare for the return flight. Two and a half hours later, at 17:54:00 UTC, they lifted off in Eagle ascent stage to rejoin Collins aboard Columbia in lunar orbit. Aldrin looked up in time to witness the flag topple: "The ascent stage of the LM separated ... I was concentrating on the computers, and Neil was studying the attitude indicator, but I looked up long enough to see the flag fall over." Subsequent Apollo missions planted their flags farther from the LM.

Columbia in lunar orbit 

During his day flying solo around the Moon, Collins never felt lonely. Although it has been said "not since Adam has any human known such solitude", Collins felt very much a part of the mission. In his autobiography he wrote: "this venture has been structured for three men, and I consider my third to be as necessary as either of the other two". In the 48 minutes of each orbit when he was out of radio contact with the Earth while Columbia passed round the far side of the Moon, the feeling he reported was not fear or loneliness, but rather "awareness, anticipation, satisfaction, confidence, almost exultation".

One of Collins' first tasks was to identify the lunar module on the ground. Each time he passed over the suspected lunar landing site, he tried in vain to find the module. On his first orbits on the back side of the Moon, Collins performed maintenance activities such as dumping excess water produced by the fuel cells and preparing the cabin for Armstrong and Aldrin to return.

Just before he reached the dark side on the third orbit, Mission Control informed Collins there was a problem with the temperature of the coolant. If it became too cold, parts of Columbia might freeze. Mission Control advised him to assume manual control and implement Environmental Control System Malfunction Procedure 17. Instead, Collins flicked the switch on the system from automatic to manual and back to automatic again, and carried on with normal housekeeping chores, while keeping an eye on the temperature. When Columbia came back around to the near side of the Moon again, he was able to report that the problem had been resolved. For the next couple of orbits, he described his time on the back side of the Moon as "relaxing". After Aldrin and Armstrong completed their EVA, Collins slept so he could be rested for the rendezvous. While the flight plan called for Eagle to meet up with Columbia, Collins was prepared for a contingency in which he would fly Columbia down to meet Eagle.

Return 

Eagle rendezvoused with Columbia at 21:24 UTC on July 21, and the two docked at 21:35. Eagles ascent stage was jettisoned into lunar orbit at 23:41. Just before the Apollo 12 flight, it was noted that Eagle was still likely to be orbiting the Moon. Later NASA reports mentioned that Eagle orbit had decayed, resulting in it impacting in an "uncertain location" on the lunar surface. In 2021, however, some calculations show that the lander may still be in orbit.

On July 23, the last night before splashdown, the three astronauts made a television broadcast in which Collins commented: 
Aldrin added: 

Armstrong concluded: 

On the return to Earth, a bearing at the Guam tracking station failed, potentially preventing communication on the last segment of the Earth return. A regular repair was not possible in the available time but the station director, Charles Force, had his ten-year-old son Greg use his small hands to reach into the housing and pack it with grease. Greg was later thanked by Armstrong.

Splashdown and quarantine 

The aircraft carrier , under the command of Captain Carl J. Seiberlich, was selected as the primary recovery ship (PRS) for Apollo 11 on June 5, replacing its sister ship, the LPH , which had recovered Apollo 10 on May 26. Hornet was then at her home port of Long Beach, California. On reaching Pearl Harbor on July 5, Hornet embarked the Sikorsky SH-3 Sea King helicopters of HS-4, a unit which specialized in recovery of Apollo spacecraft, specialized divers of UDT Detachment Apollo, a 35-man NASA recovery team, and about 120 media representatives. To make room, most of Hornets air wing was left behind in Long Beach. Special recovery equipment was also loaded, including a boilerplate command module used for training.

A presidential party consisting of Nixon, Borman, Secretary of State William P. Rogers and National Security Advisor Henry Kissinger flew to Johnston Atoll on Air Force One, then to the command ship USS Arlington in Marine One. After a night on board, they would fly to Hornet in Marine One for a few hours of ceremonies. On arrival aboard Hornet, the party was greeted by the Commander-in-Chief, Pacific Command (CINCPAC), Admiral John S. McCain Jr., and NASA Administrator Thomas O. Paine, who flew to Hornet from Pago Pago in one of Hornets carrier onboard delivery aircraft.

Weather satellites were not yet common, but US Air Force Captain Hank Brandli had access to top-secret spy satellite images. He realized that a storm front was headed for the Apollo recovery area. Poor visibility which could make locating the capsule difficult, and strong upper-level winds which "would have ripped their parachutes to shreds" according to Brandli, posed a serious threat to the safety of the mission. Brandli alerted Navy Captain Willard S. Houston Jr., the commander of the Fleet Weather Center at Pearl Harbor, who had the required security clearance. On their recommendation, Rear Admiral Donald C. Davis, commander of Manned Spaceflight Recovery Forces, Pacific, advised NASA to change the recovery area, each man risking his career.

This altered the flight plan. A different sequence of computer programs was used, one never before attempted. In a conventional entry, trajectory event P64 was followed by P67. For a skip-out re-entry, P65 and P66 were employed to handle the exit and entry parts of the skip. In this case, because they were extending the re-entry but not actually skipping out, P66 was not invoked and instead, P65 led directly to P67. The crew were also warned they would not be in a full-lift (heads-down) attitude when they entered P67.

Before dawn on July 24, Hornet launched four Sea King helicopters and three Grumman E-1 Tracers. Two of the E-1s were designated as "air boss" while the third acted as a communications relay aircraft. Two of the Sea Kings carried divers and recovery equipment. The third carried photographic equipment, and the fourth carried the decontamination swimmer and the flight surgeon. At 16:44 UTC (05:44 local time) Columbias drogue parachutes were deployed. This was observed by the helicopters. Reconnaissance aircraft flying to the original splashdown location reported the conditions Brandli and Houston had predicted.

During splashdown, Columbia landed upside down but was righted within ten minutes by flotation bags activated by the astronauts. A diver from the Navy helicopter hovering above attached a sea anchor to prevent it from drifting. More divers attached flotation collars to stabilize the module and positioned rafts for astronaut extraction.

The divers then passed biological isolation garments (BIGs) to the astronauts, and assisted them into the life raft. The possibility of bringing back pathogens from the lunar surface was considered remote, but NASA took precautions at the recovery site. The astronauts were rubbed down with a sodium hypochlorite solution and Columbia wiped with Povidone-iodine to remove any lunar dust that might be present. The astronauts were winched on board the recovery helicopter. BIGs were worn until they reached isolation facilities on board Hornet. The raft containing decontamination materials was intentionally sunk.

This practice would continue for two more Apollo missions, Apollo 12 and Apollo 14, before the Moon was proven to be barren of life, and the quarantine process dropped. Nixon welcomed the astronauts back to Earth. He told them: "[A]s a result of what you've done, the world has never been closer together before."

After Nixon departed, Hornet was brought alongside the  Columbia, which was lifted aboard by the ship's crane, placed on a dolly and moved next to the MQF. It was then attached to the MQF with a flexible tunnel, allowing the lunar samples, film, data tapes and other items to be removed. Hornet returned to Pearl Harbor, where the MQF was loaded onto a Lockheed C-141 Starlifter and airlifted to the Manned Spacecraft Center. The astronauts arrived at the Lunar Receiving Laboratory at 10:00 UTC on July 28. Columbia was taken to Ford Island for deactivation, and its pyrotechnics made safe. It was then taken to Hickham Air Force Base, from whence it was flown to Houston in a Douglas C-133 Cargomaster, reaching the Lunar Receiving Laboratory on July 30.

In accordance with the Extra-Terrestrial Exposure Law, a set of regulations promulgated by NASA on July 16 to codify its quarantine protocol, the astronauts continued in quarantine. After three weeks in confinement (first in the Apollo spacecraft, then in their trailer on Hornet, and finally in the Lunar Receiving Laboratory), the astronauts were given a clean bill of health. On August 10, 1969, the Interagency Committee on Back Contamination met in Atlanta and lifted the quarantine on the astronauts, on those who had joined them in quarantine (NASA physician William Carpentier and MQF project engineer John Hirasaki), and on Columbia itself. Loose equipment from the spacecraft remained in isolation until the lunar samples were released for study.

Celebrations 

On August 13, the three astronauts rode in ticker-tape parades in their honor in New York and Chicago, with an estimated six million attendees. On the same evening in Los Angeles there was an official state dinner to celebrate the flight, attended by members of Congress, 44 governors, Chief Justice of the United States Warren E. Burger and his predecessor, Earl Warren, and ambassadors from 83 nations at the Century Plaza Hotel. Nixon and Agnew honored each astronaut with a presentation of the Presidential Medal of Freedom.

The three astronauts spoke before a joint session of Congress on September 16, 1969. They presented two US flags, one to the House of Representatives and the other to the Senate, that they had carried with them to the surface of the Moon. The flag of American Samoa on Apollo 11 is on display at the Jean P. Haydon Museum in Pago Pago, the capital of American Samoa.

This celebration began a 38-day world tour that brought the astronauts to 22 foreign countries and included visits with the leaders of many countries. The crew toured from September 29 to November 5. Many nations honored the first human Moon landing with special features in magazines or by issuing Apollo 11 commemorative postage stamps or coins.

Legacy

Cultural significance 

Humans walking on the Moon and returning safely to Earth accomplished Kennedy's goal set eight years earlier. In Mission Control during the Apollo 11 landing, Kennedy's speech flashed on the screen, followed by the words "TASK ACCOMPLISHED, July 1969". The success of Apollo 11 demonstrated the United States' technological superiority; and with the success of Apollo 11, America had won the Space Race.

New phrases permeated into the English language. "If they can send a man to the Moon, why can't they ...?" became a common saying following Apollo 11. Armstrong's words on the lunar surface also spun off various parodies.

While most people celebrated the accomplishment, disenfranchised Americans saw it as a symbol of the divide in America, evidenced by protesters led by Ralph Abernathy outside of Kennedy Space Center the day before Apollo 11 launched. NASA Administrator Thomas Paine met with Abernathy at the occasion, both hoping that the space program can spur progress also in other regards, such as poverty in the US. Paine was then asked, and agreed, to host protesters as spectators at the launch, and Abernathy, awestruck by the spectacle, prayed for the astronauts. Racial and financial inequalities frustrated citizens who wondered why money spent on the Apollo program was not spent taking care of humans on Earth. A poem by Gil Scott-Heron called "Whitey on the Moon" (1970) illustrated the racial inequality in the United States that was highlighted by the Space Race. The poem starts with:

Twenty percent of the world's population watched humans walk on the Moon for the first time. While Apollo 11 sparked the interest of the world, the follow-on Apollo missions did not hold the interest of the nation. One possible explanation was the shift in complexity. Landing someone on the Moon was an easy goal to understand; lunar geology was too abstract for the average person. Another is that Kennedy's goal of landing humans on the Moon had already been accomplished. A well-defined objective helped Project Apollo accomplish its goal, but after it was completed it was hard to justify continuing the lunar missions.

While most Americans were proud of their nation's achievements in space exploration, only once during the late 1960s did the Gallup Poll indicate that a majority of Americans favored "doing more" in space as opposed to "doing less". By 1973, 59 percent of those polled favored cutting spending on space exploration. The Space Race had been won, and Cold War tensions were easing as the US and Soviet Union entered the era of détente. This was also a time when inflation was rising, which put pressure on the government to reduce spending. What saved the space program was that it was one of the few government programs that had achieved something great. Drastic cuts, warned Caspar Weinberger, the deputy director of the Office of Management and Budget, might send a signal that "our best years are behind us".

After the Apollo 11 mission, officials from the Soviet Union said landing humans on the Moon was dangerous and unnecessary. At the time the Soviet Union was attempting to retrieve lunar samples robotically. The Soviets publicly denied there was a race to the Moon, and indicated they were not making an attempt. Mstislav Keldysh said in July 1969, "We are concentrating wholly on the creation of large satellite systems." It was revealed in 1989 that the Soviets had tried to send people to the Moon, but were unable due to technological difficulties. The public's reaction in the Soviet Union was mixed. The Soviet government limited the release of information about the lunar landing, which affected the reaction. A portion of the populace did not give it any attention, and another portion was angered by it.

The Apollo 11 landing is referenced in the songs "Armstrong, Aldrin and Collins" by The Byrds on the 1969 album Ballad of Easy Rider and "Coon on the Moon" by Howlin' Wolf on the 1973 album The Back Door Wolf.

Spacecraft 

The command module Columbia went on a tour of the United States, visiting 49 state capitals, the District of Columbia, and Anchorage, Alaska. In 1971, it was transferred to the Smithsonian Institution, and was displayed at the National Air and Space Museum (NASM) in Washington, DC. It was in the central Milestones of Flight exhibition hall in front of the Jefferson Drive entrance, sharing the main hall with other pioneering flight vehicles such as the Wright Flyer, Spirit of St. Louis, Bell X-1, North American X-15 and Friendship 7.

Columbia was moved in 2017 to the NASM Mary Baker Engen Restoration Hangar at the Steven F. Udvar-Hazy Center in Chantilly, Virginia, to be readied for a four-city tour titled Destination Moon: The Apollo 11 Mission. This included Space Center Houston from October 14, 2017, to March 18, 2018, the Saint Louis Science Center from April 14 to September 3, 2018, the Senator John Heinz History Center in Pittsburgh from September 29, 2018, to February 18, 2019, and its last location at Museum of Flight in Seattle from March 16 to September 2, 2019. Continued renovations at the Smithsonian allowed time for an additional stop for the capsule, and it was moved to the Cincinnati Museum Center. The ribbon cutting ceremony was on September 29, 2019.

For 40 years Armstrong's and Aldrin's space suits were displayed in the museum's Apollo to the Moon exhibit, until it permanently closed on December 3, 2018, to be replaced by a new gallery which was scheduled to open in 2022. A special display of Armstrong's suit was unveiled for the 50th anniversary of Apollo 11 in July 2019. The quarantine trailer, the flotation collar and the flotation bags are in the Smithsonian's Steven F. Udvar-Hazy Center annex near Washington Dulles International Airport in Chantilly, Virginia, where they are on display along with a test lunar module.

The descent stage of the LM Eagle remains on the Moon. In 2009, the Lunar Reconnaissance Orbiter (LRO) imaged the various Apollo landing sites on the surface of the Moon, for the first time with sufficient resolution to see the descent stages of the lunar modules, scientific instruments, and foot trails made by the astronauts. The remains of the ascent stage lie at an unknown location on the lunar surface, after being abandoned and impacting the Moon. The location is uncertain because Eagle ascent stage was not tracked after it was jettisoned, and the lunar gravity field is sufficiently non-uniform to make the orbit of the spacecraft unpredictable after a short time.

In March 2012 a team of specialists financed by Amazon founder Jeff Bezos located the F-1 engines from the S-IC stage that launched Apollo 11 into space. They were found on the Atlantic seabed using advanced sonar scanning. His team brought parts of two of the five engines to the surface. In July 2013, a conservator discovered a serial number under the rust on one of the engines raised from the Atlantic, which NASA confirmed was from Apollo 11. The S-IVB third stage which performed Apollo 11's trans-lunar injection remains in a solar orbit near to that of Earth.

Moon rocks 

The main repository for the Apollo Moon rocks is the Lunar Sample Laboratory Facility at the Lyndon B. Johnson Space Center in Houston, Texas. For safekeeping, there is also a smaller collection stored at White Sands Test Facility near Las Cruces, New Mexico. Most of the rocks are stored in nitrogen to keep them free of moisture. They are handled only indirectly, using special tools. Over 100 research laboratories worldwide conduct studies of the samples; approximately 500 samples are prepared and sent to investigators every year.

In November 1969, Nixon asked NASA to make up about 250 presentation Apollo 11 lunar sample displays for 135 nations, the fifty states of the United States and its possessions, and the United Nations. Each display included Moon dust from Apollo 11 and flags, including the one of the Soviet Union, taken along by Apollo 11. The rice-sized particles were four small pieces of Moon soil weighing about 50 mg and were enveloped in a clear acrylic button about as big as a United States half dollar coin. This acrylic button magnified the grains of lunar dust. Nixon gave the Apollo 11 lunar sample displays as goodwill gifts in 1970.

Experiment results 

The Passive Seismic Experiment ran until the command uplink failed on August 25, 1969. The downlink failed on December 14, 1969. , the Lunar Laser Ranging experiment remains operational.

Armstrong's camera 

Armstrong's Hasselblad camera was thought to be lost or left on the Moon surface.

LM memorabilia 

In 2015, after Armstrong died in 2012, his widow contacted the National Air and Space Museum to inform them she had found a white cloth bag in one of Armstrong's closets. The bag contained various items, which should have been left behind in the lunar module, including the 16mm Data Acquisition Camera that had been used to capture images of the first Moon landing. The camera is currently on display at the National Air and Space Museum.

Anniversary events

40th anniversary 

On July 15, 2009, Life.com released a photo gallery of previously unpublished photos of the astronauts taken by Life photographer Ralph Morse prior to the Apollo 11 launch. From July 16 to 24, 2009, NASA streamed the original mission audio on its website in real time 40 years to the minute after the events occurred. It is in the process of restoring the video footage and has released a preview of key moments. In July 2010, air-to-ground voice recordings and film footage shot in Mission Control during the Apollo 11 powered descent and landing was re-synchronized and released for the first time. The John F. Kennedy Presidential Library and Museum set up an Adobe Flash website that rebroadcasts the transmissions of Apollo 11 from launch to landing on the Moon.

On July 20, 2009, Armstrong, Aldrin, and Collins met with US President Barack Obama at the White House. "We expect that there is, as we speak, another generation of kids out there who are looking up at the sky and are going to be the next Armstrong, Collins, and Aldrin", Obama said. "We want to make sure that NASA is going to be there for them when they want to take their journey." On August 7, 2009, an act of Congress awarded the three astronauts a Congressional Gold Medal, the highest civilian award in the United States. The bill was sponsored by Florida Senator Bill Nelson and Florida Representative Alan Grayson.

A group of British scientists interviewed as part of the anniversary events reflected on the significance of the Moon landing:

50th anniversary 

On June 10, 2015, Congressman Bill Posey introduced resolution H.R. 2726 to the 114th session of the United States House of Representatives directing the United States Mint to design and sell commemorative coins in gold, silver and clad for the 50th anniversary of the Apollo 11 mission. On January 24, 2019, the Mint released the Apollo 11 Fiftieth Anniversary commemorative coins to the public on its website.

A documentary film, Apollo 11, with restored footage of the 1969 event, premiered in IMAX on March 1, 2019, and broadly in theaters on March 8.

The Smithsonian Institute's National Air and Space Museum and NASA sponsored the "Apollo 50 Festival" on the National Mall in Washington DC. The three day (July 18 to 20, 2019) outdoor festival featured hands-on exhibits and activities, live performances, and speakers such as Adam Savage and NASA scientists.

The program also included a 17-minute show that combined full-motion video projected on the Washington Monument to recreate the assembly and launch of the Saturn V rocket. There were three shows per night on July 19–20, with the last show on Saturday, delayed slightly so the portion where Armstrong first set foot on the Moon would happen exactly 50 years to the second after the actual event.

On July 19, 2019, the Google Doodle paid tribute to the Apollo 11 Moon Landing, complete with a link to an animated YouTube video with voiceover by astronaut Michael Collins.

Aldrin, Collins, and Armstrong's sons were hosted by President Donald Trump in the Oval Office.

Films and documentaries 
 Footprints on the Moon, a 1969 documentary film by Bill Gibson and Barry Coe, about the Apollo 11 mission
 Moonwalk One, a 1971 documentary film by Theo Kamecke
 Apollo 11: As it Happened, a 1994 six-hour documentary on ABC News' coverage of the event
 Apollo 11, a 2019 documentary film by Todd Douglas Miller with restored footage of the 1969 event
 Chasing the Moon, a July 2019 PBS three-night six-hour documentary, directed by Robert Stone, examined the events leading up to the Apollo 11 mission. An accompanying book of the same name was also released.
 8 Days: To the Moon and Back, a PBS and BBC Studios 2019 documentary film by Anthony Philipson re-enacting major portions of the Apollo 11 mission using mission audio recordings, new studio footage, NASA and news archives, and computer-generated imagery.

See also
 
 
 
 Moon landing conspiracy theories

References

Notes

Citations 
In some of the following sources, times are shown in the format hours:minutes:seconds (e.g. 109:24:15), referring to the mission's Ground Elapsed Time (GET), based on the official launch time of July 16, 1969, 13:32:00 UTC (000:00:00 GET).

Sources

External links 

 "Apollo 11 transcripts" at Spacelog
 Apollo 11 in real time

Multimedia 
 —Remastered videos of the original landing.
 Dynamic timeline of lunar excursion. Lunar Reconnaissance Orbiter Camera
 
 
 Apollo 11 Restored EVA Part 1 (1h of restored footage)
 Apollo 11: As They Photographed It (Augmented Reality) The New York Times, Interactive, July 18, 2019
 "Coverage of the Flight of Apollo 11" provided by Todd Kosovich for RadioTapes.com. Radio station recordings (airchecks) covering the flight of Apollo 11.

 
Buzz Aldrin
Neil Armstrong
Michael Collins (astronaut)
Apollo program missions
1969 on the Moon
Soft landings on the Moon
Spacecraft launched by Saturn rockets
Articles containing video clips
Crewed missions to the Moon